Zhuozhou railway station is a station on Beijing–Guangzhou railway in Zhuozhou, Baoding, Hebei.

History 
The station was opened in 1899.

See also 
 Zhuozhou East railway station

References 

Railway stations in Hebei
Stations on the Beijing–Guangzhou Railway